Koushalam is a 1993 Indian Malayalam film, directed by T. S. Mohan and starring Siddique and Urvashi in the lead roles.

Cast
 Siddique as S.I Gopinathan
 Urvashi as Advocate Maya Devi
 Shwetha Menon as Sashikala
 Sainudeen as Mathunni
 Prathapachandran as College Principal
 Janardhanan as Chackochan
 Kundara Johnny as CI Thomas Mathew
 KPAC Sunny as Commissioner	
 Kuthiravattam Pappu as MLA K. S. Pilla
 Philomina as Mariya chedathi
 Thrissur Elsy as Hostel warden
 Zeenath as Rosy
 Santhakumari as Gopi's mother
 Mala Aravindan as Priest
 Sathaar as Adv Ravikumar
 Mafia Sasi as Victor Solomon
 Bindu Varappuzha as Thresia
 Biyon as Kittu (child artist)
Bheeman Raghu - Cameo Appearance

Soundtrack
"Nilaavin" - K. S. Chithra
"Innoraayiram" - K. S. Chithra, Sujatha Mohan, Minmini
"Kinavin" - K. J. Yesudas

Trivia
Originally, actor Jayaram was cast as the hero in Koushalam, Jayaram avoided this role, so Sidique become the hero in the movie.

References

External links
 

1993 films
1990s Malayalam-language films
Films scored by Raveendran